Lasiopetalum trichanthera is a species of flowering plant in the family Malvaceae and is endemic to a restricted area in the south-west of Western Australia. It is an erect to straggling, sticky shrub with many hairy stems, egg-shaped leaves and bright pink and dark red flowers.

Description
The leaves are covered with white and rust-coloured, star-shaped hairs, densely so on the lower surface, but become glabrous with age.

Taxonomy
Lasiopetalum trichanthera was first formally described in 2015 by Kelly Anne Shepherd and Carolyn F. Wilkins in the journal Nuytsia from specimens collected in Bobakine Nature Reserve in 2005. The specific epithet (trichanthera) means "hairy anthers".

Distribution and habitat
This lasiopetalum is only known from two small populations in nature reserves near Northam, where it grows in woodland with a shrubby understorey.

Conservation status
Lasiopetalum trichanthera is listed as "Priority Two" by the Western Australian Government Department of Biodiversity, Conservation and Attractions, meaning that it is poorly known and from only one or a few locations.

References

trichanthera
Malvales of Australia
Flora of Western Australia
Plants described in 2015